Adolescence is the human transition from puberty to adult.

Adolescence may also refer to:
Adolescence (mixtape), a 2021 mixtape by Unknown T
Adolescence (EP), a 2015 EP by Gnarwolves
Adolescence (ballet)
Adolescence (film), a 1966 film